Hubert George Perkins (18 June 1907 – 4 May 1935) was an English cricketer.  Perkins was a left-handed batsman who bowled slow left-arm orthodox.  He was born at Attleborough, Warwickshire.

Perkins made his first-class debut for Warwickshire against Glamorgan at Edgbaston in the 1926 County Championship.  He made three further first-class appearances for the county, the last of which came against Glamorgan at St. Helen's, Swansea, in the 1927 County Championship.  In his four first-class appearances for the county, he scored 10 runs at a batting average of 3.33, with a high score of 6 not out.  With the ball, he bowled 21 overs (126 balls) but only took a single wicket, that of Glamorgan's Jock Tait.

He died at Nuneaton, Warwickshire, on 4 May 1935.

References

External links
Hubert Perkins at ESPNcricinfo
Hubert Perkins at CricketArchive

1907 births
1935 deaths
Sportspeople from Nuneaton
English cricketers
Warwickshire cricketers